The Adventures of the Thin Man radio series, initially starring Les Damon, was broadcast on all four major radio networks during the years 1941 to 1950. Claudia Morgan had the female lead role of Nora Charles throughout the program's entire nine-year run. The radio series was modeled after the film series which was based on the 1934 Dashiell Hammett novel.

The first series, sponsored by Woodbury Soap Company, aired on NBC Wednesdays at 8pm from July 2, 1941 to December 23, 1942. Les Damon portrayed detective Nick Charles, and he continued in the role into 1943.

Sponsored by General Foods (Post Toasties, Maxwell House Coffee, Sanka), the next series began on CBS January 8, 1943, airing on Fridays at 8:30pm and some Sunday timeslots and continuing until December 26, 1947. Les Tremayne and David Gothard were heard as Nick Charles in 1944–45, with Tremayne still in the role in 1945–46. Les Damon returned as Nick in 1946–47, with Tremayne back in 1948-49 (sponsored by Pabst Blue Ribbon beer during the summer of '48). The last actor to do the part was Joseph Curtin in 1950.

See also
The Thin Man

Listen to
Boxcars711: The Adventures of the Thin Man: "Nora's Wedding Anniversary" (October 10, 1943)

References

1941 radio programme debuts
1950 radio programme endings
1940s American radio programs
American radio dramas
NBC radio programs
CBS Radio programs
Mutual Broadcasting System programs
ABC radio programs
Radio programmes based on novels
Detective radio shows
Nick and Nora Charles